Gheorghi Ivanov Jovcev (born 6 May 1950, in Sekirovo, a part of the town of Rakovski, Bulgaria) is the current Bulgarian Catholic bishop of the Roman Catholic Diocese of Sofia and Plovdiv.

Early life and education

Gheorghi Ivanov Jovcev was educated at Professional School of Agriculture in Belozem where he studied internal combustion engines. His military service was in Sofia. Because of the Communist regime, he secretly prepared for the priesthood, being parish priest in Plovdiv, Rakovski, Kaloyanovo, Duvanlii and Zhitnitsa.

Religious career
On 9 May 1976, Jovcev was ordained Catholic priest by Bishop Bogdan Dobranov. He studied theology at the Pontifical Oriental Institute in Rome, Italy.

On 6 July 1988, Jovcev became Apostolic Administrator of the Roman Catholic Diocese of Sofia and Plovdiv and Titular Bishop of Lamphua. On 31 July 1988, he was consecrated bishop by Archbishop Francesco Colasuonno, Bishop Samuel Dzhundrin, AA and Exarch Methodius Stratiev, AA at Cathedral of St Louis, Plovdiv.

On 13 November 1995, he was appointed bishop of the Roman Catholic Diocese of Sofia and Plovdiv. Jovcev is a member of the Episcopal Conference of Bulgaria. In the Episcopal Conference of Bulgaria is the chairman of various committees, including Congregation for Divine Worship and the Discipline of the Sacraments, Pontifical Council for Justice and Peace, Tip for Families, Council for Secular Parties and Council Catechism.

Awards
Jovcev was awarded with the Grand Cross of the Order pro merito Melitensi, from the Order of Malta, on 19 June 2009 in the city of Rakovski, Bulgaria.

Collaboration with Communist regime's secret service

In 2012, Bishop Jovcev was charged that in 1987 he was recruited by the Bulgarian secret service. Jovcev called all these accusations as slander.

References

External links
 http://www.catholic-hierarchy.org/bishop/bjovcev.html 

21st-century Roman Catholic bishops in Bulgaria
Living people
1950 births
20th-century Roman Catholic bishops in Bulgaria
People from Rakovski
Recipients of the Order pro Merito Melitensi